Opostega angulata is a moth of the family Opostegidae. It was described by Aleksey Maksimovich Gerasimov in 1930. It is known from Uzbekistan.

Adults have been recorded in April, June, July and August.

References

Opostegidae
Moths described in 1930